Nethy Bridge railway station served the village of Nethy Bridge, Highland, Scotland from 1863 to 1965 on the Strathspey Railway.

History 
The station opened on 1 July 1863 as Abernethy by the Strathspey Railway. Its name was changed to Nethy Bridge to avoid confusion with Abernethy near Perth. This meant the village was renamed, though the name Abernethy is still in frequent use for the area.

The station closed to both passengers and goods traffic on 18 October 1965.

References

External links 

Disused railway stations in Highland (council area)
Railway stations in Great Britain opened in 1863
Railway stations in Great Britain closed in 1965
Former Great North of Scotland Railway stations
Beeching closures in Scotland
1863 establishments in Scotland
1965 disestablishments in Scotland